"Good Country People" is a short story by Flannery O'Connor. It was published in 1955 in her short story collection A Good Man Is Hard to Find. A devout Roman Catholic, O'Connor often used religious themes in her work. Many considered this to be one of her greatest stories.

Plot summary 
Mrs. Hopewell owns a farm in rural Georgia which she runs with the assistance of her tenants, Mr. and Mrs. Freeman. Mrs. Hopewell's daughter, Joy, is thirty-two years old and lost her leg in a childhood shooting  accident. Joy is an atheist and has a Ph.D. in philosophy but seems non-sensible to her mother, and in an act of rebellion against her mother, Joy changed her name to "Hulga," the ugliest name Mrs. Hopewell can imagine.

A Bible salesman, who introduces himself as Manley Pointer, visits the family and is invited for dinner despite the Hopewells' lack of interest in purchasing Bibles. Mrs. Hopewell believes Manley is "good country people." While leaving the home, Pointer invites Joy for a picnic date the next evening, and she imagines seducing the innocent Bible salesman. During the date, he persuades her to go up into the barn loft where he persuades her to remove her prosthetic leg and takes her glasses. He then produces a hollowed-out Bible containing a bottle of whiskey, sex cards, and some condoms.  He tries to get her to drink some liquor, but she rebuffs his advances.  At that point he disappears with her leg after telling her that he collects prostheses from disabled people and is a nihilistic atheist.

Themes
In "Good Country People," O'Connor uses irony and a finely controlled comic sense to reveal the modern world as it is—without vision or knowledge. As in O'Connor's story "A Good Man Is Hard to Find," a stranger—deceptively polite but ultimately evil—intrudes upon a family with destructive consequences. In Joy’s case, despite her advanced academic degrees, she is unable to see what is bad, and her mother's stereotyping perspective proves to be equally misleading and false.

Ugliness
Monica Carol Miller, writing for Middle Georgia State University, stated that Joy represents a class of characters in southern literature that use ugliness as a way to avoid traditional southern expectations for women to marry and become primarily homemakers, in contrast to the idea of the southern belle.  Miller also states that the southern concept of ugliness extends to both appearance and behavior, and refers to the theme of ugliness in this literature as the "ugly plot".  This "ugly plot" often includes a conflict between mothers attempting to make their daughters eligible for the traditional roles and expectations, causing the daughters to rebel further.  According to Miller, this is reflected in Good Country People by dinner-table suggestions made by Mrs. Hopewell about smiling that lead to Joy storming off while referencing philosophy.  Noting that Joy's appearance and behavior are intentional, she suggests that this intentionality is what angers Mrs. Hopewell about Joy's behavior.  Miller also suggests that Joy uses ugliness as a way to chose intellectualism rather than more traditional southern domestic life.  She also sees social class as playing a role in Joy's behavior.  Because the Hopewells are higher-status landowners, Joy is able to pursue intellectualism rather than domesticism, while two lower-class female character in the story (the Freeman sisters) are portrayed as having no options other than marriage.  Miller writes "ugliness as a choice [...] points to the material requirements of being able to imagine alternatives to expectations of gender".

Suffering
Davis J. Leigh, writing for Renascence, notes that O'Connor's writings reflect her Roman Catholic faith.  One of her influences was theologian Romano Guardini, who stated "what Christ suffered, God suffered".  Leigh describes O'Connor's philosophy on the matter as suffering being "a shared experience with Christ".  O'Connor herself spent the last 13 years of her life suffering from the effects of lupus.  Leigh equates Joy's removal of her wooden leg for the Bible salesman as showing a willingness to share her sufferings with the salesman, who then uses her trust of him to state that she had faith in something.  Leigh also describes the salesman as a suffering character, trapped in a secular mind.  His rejection of Joy is a mockery of her suffering and a rejection of his own.  Seeking a philosophical freedom, Joy was only partially transformed through suffering, while the salesman found no transformation.

Disability
Sara Hosey, in an article for Teaching American Literature, examined "Good Country People" from a perspective of disability.  Hosey notes that when talking to the salesman, Joy states that she is 17, rather than her true age of 32, reflected her pretending to be a young woman, which has traditionally been viewed as dependent.  The salesman also coerces her into the barn loft by suggesting she was unable to climb the ladder, leading to climbing to demonstrate her normalcy.  After the salesman takes her glasses and false leg, Joy is then dependent due to her disability.  By attempting to demonstrate her normalcy and independence, Joy is rendered dependent and her disability is emphasized.

Religious elements
Hosey also compares Joy’s intelligence to a spiritual prosthetic, serving as a replacement for the lack of religiosity in her life.  When the salesman tells her that "she ain't so smart", her philosophical basis is destroyed.  In the book Mystery and Manners, O'Connor herself stated that Joy was "spiritually as well as physically crippled".

See also
Flannery O'Connor bibliography

References

Sources
 
 
 

Short stories by Flannery O'Connor
1955 short stories
Prosthetics in fiction
Southern Gothic short stories